The Nieland House is a historic building located in Guttenberg, Iowa, United States.  This two-story brick structure's construction dates from before 1886.  It is local version of the New England Saltbox.  The second floor has only three windows on the northern ⅔ of the facade. The main floor is a symmetrical five bays wide.  The building was listed on the National Register of Historic Places in 1984.

References

Saltbox architecture in Iowa
Houses in Guttenberg, Iowa
Houses on the National Register of Historic Places in Iowa
National Register of Historic Places in Clayton County, Iowa